Nico Eisenhauer (born 22 February 1980, in Lindenfels, Germany) is a German biologist, soil ecologist and professor for experimental interaction ecology at Leipzig University.

Scientific career 

Nico Eisenhauer obtained his diploma in animal ecology at the Darmstadt University of Technology in 2005, and then was awarded a doctorate in 2008 from Darmstadt University of Technology with a thesis "Earthworms in a plant diversity gradient: Direct and indirect effects on plant competition and establishment."  From 2008 to 2010 he worked as Postdoc in the Jena Experiment at the Darmstadt University of Technology and Georg August University Göttingen,  from 2010 to 2012 a Postdoc at the University of Minnesota and then at the Technical University of Munich where he was an Emmy Noether group leader. He then habilitated at the Georg August University Göttingen in Ecology and Zoology.

From 2012 – 2014, he worked as Associate Professor for Terrestrial Ecology at the Friedrich Schiller University Jena. Since 2014, he has been a Full Professor  for Experimental Interaction Ecology at the German Centre for Integrative Biodiversity Research (iDiv) Halle-Jena-Leipzig and Leipzig University. Since 2015 he is Speaker of the Research Unit “Jena Experiment,” funded by the German Research Foundation. He is also Head of the iDiv Ecotron and the MyDiv experiment, as well as founding member of the "Soil BON" consortium. His main research focus is on reasons for and ecosystem consequences of changes in biodiversity.

Prizes and awards 

 2016 ERC Starting Grant by the European Research Council
 2014 Heinz Maier-Leibnitz-Preis by the German Research Foundation
 2012 Emmy-Noether scholarship by the German Research Foundation
 2010 Postdoc research scholarship by the German Research Foundation
 2004 Research scholarship by the German Academic Exchange Service (DAAD)

Editorial board 
 
 since 2019 Editor-in-Chief at Soil Organisms
 2014 – 2018	Editor-in-Chief at Pedobiologia – Journal of Soil Ecology
 2012 – 2013	Subject Editor at Plant and Soil
 2011 – 2013	Subject Editor at Biodiversity and Conservation

Selected publications 

 Eisenhauer N, Bonn A, Guerra CA (2019) Recognizing the quiet extinction of invertebrates. Nature Communications 10: Article number 50. 
 Eisenhauer N, Dobies T, Cesarz S, Hobbie SE, Meyer RJ, Worm K, Reich PB. (2013) Plant diversity effects on soil food webs are stronger than those of elevated CO2 and N deposition in a long-term grassland experiment. PNAS 110:6889–6894. According to Google Scholar, this publication has been cited 132 times
 Eisenhauer N and Guerra CA (2019) Global maps of soil nematode worms. Nature 572:187–188. 
 Eisenhauer N*, Hines J*, Isbell F, van der Plas F, Hobbie SE, Kazanski CE, Lehmann A, Liu M, Lochner A, Rillig MC, Vogel A, Worm K, Reich PB (2018) Plant diversity maintains multiple soil functions in future environments. eLife 7:e41228. *shared first authorship 
 Isbell F, Craven D, 34 co-authors, Eisenhauer N (2015) Biodiversity increases the resistance of ecosystem productivity to climate extremes. Nature 626:574–577. According to Google Scholar, this publication has been cited 423 times
 Phillips HRP, Guerra CA, 137 co-authors, Cameron EK*, Eisenhauer N* (2019) Global distribution of earthworm diversity. Science, accepted. *shared senior authorship. 
 Reich PB, Tilman D, Isbell F, Mueller K, Hobbie SE, Flynn DFB, Eisenhauer N (2012) Impacts of biodiversity loss escalate through time as redundancy fades. Science 336:589–592.  According to Google Scholar, this publication has been cited 529 times
 Scherber C, Eisenhauer N, 37 co-authors, Tscharnke T (2010) Bottom-up effects of plant diversity on biotic interactions in a biodiversity experiment. Nature 468:553–556. According to Google Scholar, this publication has been cited 588 times
 Schwarz B, Barnes AD*, Thakur MP, Brose U, Ciobanu M, Reich PB, Rich RL, Rosenbaum B, Stefanski A, Eisenhauer N* (2017) Warming alters energetic structure and function but not resilience of soil food webs. Nature Climate Change 7:895–900. *shared senior authorship. 
 Thakur MP, Reich PB, Hobbie SE, Stefanski A, Rich R, Rice KE, Eddy WC, Eisenhauer N (2018) Reduced feeding activity of soil detritivores under warmer and drier conditions. Nature Climate Change 8:75–78.

References 

Living people
1980 births
German ecologists
People from Bergstraße (district)
Technische Universität Darmstadt alumni
Academic staff of the University of Jena
Academic journal editors